James A. Thomas Farm is a historic home and farm located near Pittsboro, Chatham County, North Carolina.  The house consist of a one-story frame cabin, perhaps constructed during the late 1860s or early 1870s, with a rear shed and a two-story, vernacular Greek Revival style wing added in the early 1880s.  Also on the property are several contributing log, weatherboard and board-and-batten outbuildings.

It was listed on the National Register of Historic Places in 1985.

References

Houses on the National Register of Historic Places in North Carolina
Greek Revival houses in North Carolina
Houses completed in 1870
Houses in Chatham County, North Carolina
National Register of Historic Places in Chatham County, North Carolina
Pittsboro, North Carolina